The Campeonato Sul-Mato-Grossense is the football league of the state of Mato Grosso do Sul, Brazil. Before 1979, the Sul-Mato-Grossense clubs competed in the Campeonato Mato-Grossense, because Mato Grosso and Mato Grosso do Sul were a single state.

Format

Serie A

First Stage: double round-robin, in which all teams play each other home-and-away games.
Second Stage: home-and-away playoffs between the top 4 teams in the first stage.

The winner of second stage is crowned the champion.

The two teams last placed in the first stage are relegated to Serie B.

As in any other Brazilian soccer championship, the format can change every year.

List of champions

Titles by team

Teams in bold stills active.

By city

Participation

Most appearances

Below is the list of clubs that have more appearances in the Campeonato Sul-Mato-Grossense.

External links
FFMS Official Website
RSSSF

 
Sul-Matogrossense